The Church of St. Mary the Virgin is the main Episcopal church in Sagada, Mountain Province, Philippines.

It was built in 1904 by American missionaries under the auspices of the Episcopal Church in the United States (Protestant Episcopal Church in the United States of America) led by Rev. John Staunton when the Philippines was opened to American Protestant missions after the country was ceded to the United States from Spain in 1898. In 1918 the Rev Albert Frost was appointed as Staunton's assistant. St Mary's, Sagada was notoriously Anglo-Catholic under Fr Staunton's leadership, but Frost introduced a number of new devotions: the proper observance of Candlemas and Corpus Christi, May devotions to the Blessed Virgin Mary, June devotions in honour of the Sacred Heart, November intercessions for the Holy Souls, and Benediction of the Blessed Sacrament as a regular feature of Sunday worship. In 1918 Bishop Brent was translated to a diocese in New York, and jurisdiction of the Philippines was transferred to Bishop Graves of Shanghai. Graves undertook a visitation in November 1918, and held that the singing of hymns before the Reserved Sacrament and the statue of the Virgin were illegal. He issued a directive, prohibiting such veneration.  Despite threats to resign, Staunton and Frost remained in post, and the practices of Sagada continued. However, the appointment of Brent's successor, Frank Mosher, led to a final row: in September 1924 the Bishop invited the Chaplain of Brent School to open the communion rail to non-Episcopalians. Staunton declared this to be a "Pan-Protestant virus", and both he and Frost resigned at the end of 1924.

American historian William Henry Scott was buried in its grounds on October 10, 1993.

The church is subsequently a member of the Episcopal Church in the Philippines.

References

Churches in the Philippines
Protestantism in the Philippines
Churches in Mountain Province